Baghiana Kalan  is a village and Union Council near Phoolnagar in Pattoki Tehsil,  Kasur District in the Punjab province of Pakistan. It is part of Pattoki Tehsil, and was the location in 2004 of a speech by Khurshid Mahmud Kasuri, the former Foreign minister of Pakistan, about the India-Pakistan peace process.

References

Kasur District